Paul Chin-Yue Chiang (born 1960) is a Canadian politician who was elected to represent the riding of Markham—Unionville in the House of Commons of Canada in the 2021 Canadian federal election. He is the Parliamentary Secretary to the Minister of Diversity and Inclusion

Early life
Born in Karachi, Pakistan to Chinese parents, he grew up in Pakistan until his family immigrated to Canada in 1976 to join his father's family. His grandparents had previously lived in Pakistan since 1927.

Career
Chiang was police officer in York Regional Police for 28 years, retiring in 2020 as a Sergeant. In 2013, he served as a diversity officer at the Diversity and Cultural Resources Unit. He first entered policing with London Police Service in 1992, and also served with the Durham Regional Police before joining York in 1999.

Personal life
He is married to Monica, who is also of Chinese descent and born in Pakistan (Rawalpindi). They have three children. In addition to Hakka Chinese, Mandarin, Cantonese, Hubei and English, Chiang is also fluent in Urdu, Punjabi and knows Pashto from his early years in Pakistan.

Election results

References

External links

Living people
1960s births
21st-century Canadian politicians
Liberal Party of Canada MPs
Members of the House of Commons of Canada from Ontario
Canadian politicians of Chinese descent
Canadian police officers
Pakistani emigrants to Canada
Pakistani people of Chinese descent